Robert James Fair (October 15, 1919 –January 20, 2002) was an American politician from the state of Indiana. He was born in Detroit, Michigan and later moved to Princeton, Indiana and attended Princeton High School. He attended George Washington University. He served in the United States Army Signal Corps from 1944 to 1946. He served as Gibson County Attorney from 1954 to 1955 and Princeton City Attorney from 1956 to 1959. A Democrat, he served in the Indiana Senate from 1966 to 1978. Fair served as President pro tempore of the Indiana Senate from 1976 to 1978 and is the last Democrat to hold that position. Fair ran for Governor of Indiana in 1976, but lost the primary. He died on January 20, 2002. He was a Methodist.

References

1919 births
2002 deaths
Democratic Party Indiana state senators
20th-century American politicians